The Stuhna, or Stugna, is a minor river in Ukraine, a right tributary of Dnieper River. Its length is 68 km.

The river was mentioned in the Tale of Igor's Campaign and was a place of the Battle of the Stuhna River.
Cities located on the river: Vasylkiv, Obukhiv and Ukrainka. The Stuhna passes along the villages of Velyka Snitynka, Motovylivska Slobidka, Velyka Motovylivka, Mala Soltanivka, Borova, Skrypky, Khlepcha, Velyka Soltanivka, Zdorivka, Zastuhna, Kopachiv, Pohreby, Tarasivka, Novi Bezradychi and Tatsenky.

Rivers of Kyiv Oblast